Victor L. Crawford (April 19, 1932 – March 2, 1996) was an American lawyer and politician.

Born in Richmond, Virginia. Crawford went to Hargrave Military Academy and to the Washington, D.C. public schools. Crawford served in the United States Army from 1952 to 1955. In 1958, Crawford received his bachelor's degree from University of Maryland and his law degree from Georgetown Law Center in 1960. He was admitted to the Maryland bar in 1960 and lived in Chevy Chase, Maryland. Crawford served in the Maryland House of Delegates from 1967 to 1969 and was a Democrat. He then served in the Maryland Senate from 1969 to 1983. Crawford died from throat cancer in the Johns Hopkins University Hospital in Baltimore, Maryland.

Notes

1932 births
1996 deaths
People from Chevy Chase, Maryland
Politicians from Richmond, Virginia
Military personnel from Richmond, Virginia
University System of Maryland alumni
Georgetown University Law Center alumni
Maryland lawyers
Democratic Party members of the Maryland House of Delegates
Democratic Party Maryland state senators
Deaths from cancer in Maryland
Lawyers from Richmond, Virginia
20th-century American politicians
20th-century American lawyers